is a 2012 Japanese film directed by Yukihiko Tsutsumi. It was released on 7 April 2012. This is a sequel to the TBS drama SPEC series.

Cast
 Erika Toda as Saya Tōma
 Ryo Kase as Takeru Sebumi
 Chiaki Kuriyama as Satoko Aoike
 Kasumi Arimura as Miyabi Masaki
 Denden as Kenzō Ichiyanagi
 Yuko Asano as Madam Yang/Madam Yin
 Ryūnosuke Kamiki as Jūichi Ninomae
 Saki Fukuda as Mirei Shimura
 Kippei Shiina as Sukehiro Tsuda

Reception
According to the box-office report by The Motion Picture Producers Association of Japan, the film had grossed ¥2.39 billion (US$24 million).

References

External links
 
 劇場版 SPEC～天～(2012) at allcinema 
 劇場版 SPEC 天 at KINENOTE 

Films directed by Yukihiko Tsutsumi
Japanese sequel films
Tokyo Metropolitan Police Department in fiction
2010s Japanese films